2000 Japanese Super Cup was the Japanese Super Cup competition. The match was played at National Stadium in Tokyo on March 4, 2000. Júbilo Iwata won the championship.

Match details

References

Japanese Super Cup
2000 in Japanese football
Júbilo Iwata matches
Nagoya Grampus matches